Peter Melville Brock (27 October 1915 – 28 November 2000) was an Australian rules footballer who played for Glenelg Football Club in the South Australian National Football League (SANFL) in the 1930s and 1940s, winning the Magarey Medal in 1940.

Brock was a Glenelg man to the core, he has been described as, "....a Tiger through and through.  He grew up at the Bay, worshipped the local club's football stars, then went on to be worshipped himself, one of the great players to wear the black and gold."

He made his league debut with the Bays in 1932, and in 1934 played in an unforgettable against-the-odds premiership, being named amongst Glenelg's best in their defeat of Port Adelaide. 

He was Glenelg's best and fairest player in 1935 and 1940, and won the most consistent player award four times.  In 1940 he scored a runaway Magarey Medal triumph, polling 19 votes – 5 votes clear of runner-up Max Murdy of South Adelaide.  In typically humble style Brock said he "never entertained the thought of winning a Magarey Medal, not in my wildest dreams".

As well as being consistent, Mel Brock was highly versatile.  Much of his early football was played in the backline, but later he excelled as both a follower and a rover. He played a total of 166 games, including 3 with the West Adelaide–Glenelg wartime pairing.

He retained his passion for football for the rest of his life, coaching the reserves side in the 1950s, and was a regular spectator at Glenelg matches, both home and away. Brock died in 2000 and was survived by his wife, Dorothy, and son, Kevin.

References

External links 

Australian rules footballers from South Australia
Glenelg Football Club players
Magarey Medal winners
1915 births
2000 deaths